Rafael García may refer to:

Politics
 Rafael Villicaña García (born 1958), Mexican politician
 Rafael García Tinajero (born 1960), Mexican politician

Sports
 Rafael García Cortés (born 1958), Spanish retired footballer
 Rafael García (footballer, born 1974), Mexican footballer
 Rafa García (footballer) (born 1986), Spanish footballer
 Rafael Garcia (soccer, born 1988), American soccer player
 Rafael García (footballer, born 1989), Uruguayan footballer
 Rafael Garcia (footballer, born 1993), German footballer
 Rafael García, birth name of Mexican professional wrestler better known as Super Caló
 Rafael García Jr., an American-born Mexican MMA fighter

Other
 Rafael García Valiño (1898–1972), Spanish army officer in the Spanish Civil War
 Rafael García Granados (1893–1955), Mexican historian
 Rafael García Herreros (1909–1992), Colombian priest
 Rafael García Serrano (1917–1988), Spanish journalist
 Felo García (Rafael García Picado, born 1928), Costa Rican painter
 Rafael García Bárcena, Cuban philosopher
 Rafael Rivera Garcia, artist